Positive assurance within accounting ethics, is the affirmation that a Certified Public Accountant believes a something to be true or correct. Issuing an opinion that the financial statements are presented fairly in conformity with U.S. GAAP is an example of a CPA providing positive assurance.

When an unmodified audit opinion is given, by definition, the CPA has provided positive assurance because they performed work to prove that financial statements are free from material error.

The corollary is negative assurance, a statement about what the CPA does not know. A statement that the CPA was "not aware of material modifications that should be made to financial statements for them to conform with U.S. generally accepted accounting principles" is negative assurance used in review reports.

See also
Government Accountability Office
Index of accounting articles
International Organization of Supreme Audit Institutions
Legal liability of certified public accountants

References

Accounting in the United States
Auditing terms